Aydar Maratovich Nuriev (born 6 December 1994) is a Russian racing driver of Tatar descent. He was runner up in the 2018 FIA European Rallycross Championship in his debut season and he won the 2019 FIA European Rallycross Championship in only his second year of ERX participation (Super1600 category).

Racing career
Aydar began his career in 2007 in the Tatarstan Karting Championship, also raced in European Autocross Championship, Russian Rallycross Cup and Russian Rallycross Championship, Russian Autocross Cup, Russian Racing Championship, Russian Circuit Racing Series (1st in National class of 2017 season), Russian Winter Ice Racing Cup and Russian Winter Ice Racing Championship, Tatarstan Circuit Racing Championship and Tatarstan Circuit Racing Cup, Tatarstan Winter Ice Racing Cup and Tatarstan Winter Ice Racing Championship, Canyon Cup and Winter Canyon Cup (circuit racing series in Tatarstan).

On 10 March 2019, it was announced that Aydar will drive for Volland Racing for the 2019 FIA European Rallycross Championship season, to race at Audi A1s Super1600. Aydar had a successful start of the season with victory at 2019 Euro RX of Barcelona, and won the championship.

Racing record

Career summary

Complete Russian Racing Championship results
(key) (Races in bold indicate pole position) (Races in italics indicate fastest lap)

National

* — Race results have been canceled.

Complete Russian Circuit Racing Series results
(key) (Races in bold indicate pole position) (Races in italics indicate fastest lap)

National

Touring-Light

Complete FIA European Rallycross Championship results
(key)

Super1600

References

External links

 Profile at raf-rcrs.ru
 

Tatar people of Russia
Volga Tatar people
Tatar sportspeople
Russian racing drivers
Russian Circuit Racing Series drivers
European Rallycross Championship drivers
Sportspeople from Kazan
1994 births
Living people